"Watch My Dance" is a song by Cypriot singer Loukas Yorkas featuring Stereo Mike. It is a laïko song set to a Zeibekiko dance rhythm, performed in Greek by Yiorkas, fused with rapped verses performed in English by Stereo Mike. It represented Greece in the Eurovision Song Contest 2011. A snippet of the song was released by broadcaster Hellenic Broadcasting Corporation (ERT) on 9 February 2011 along with the other candidate songs from the national final, with the full song being presented by the broadcaster on 15 February 2011. On 2 March 2011, Yiorkas won a national final held by the broadcaster, competing against five other acts competing to represent Greece in the contest.

Background

After an open call to record labels to submit proposals, on 11 January 2011, ERT officially announced the six candidates for the Greek national final, amongst them Loukas Yorkas. Loukas Yorkas chose the song "Watch my Dance" featuring Stereo Mike, written by Giannis Christodoulopoulos with lyrics by Eleana Vrahali. The lyrics are sung in Greek by Yiorkas and features English rapping by Stereo Mike. The song is a fusion of hip hop and dancehall with the distinctively Greek music genres of zeibekiko and laïkó. There is heavy percussion in the laiko segment, which is uncustomary to traditional laiko.

Six acts competed on 2 March 2011 in the Greek National Final. The song was performed fifth in the final by Yiorkas and Stereo Mike. At the end of voting, "Watch My Dance" was revealed as the winner.

Eurovision
Yiorkas and Stereo Mike performed in the 2011 Eurovision Song Contest in Düsseldorf, Germany, in the second half of the first semi-final of the contest on 10 May 2011. "Watch My Dance" won the first semi-final with a total of 133 points and competed in the final held on 14 May 2011, where he placed 7th with a total of 120 points.

Track listing
Digital download
 "Watch My Dance" – 3:03

Charts

Release history

References

2011 songs
Eurovision songs of 2011
Eurovision songs of Greece
English-language Greek songs
Macaronic songs
Songs written by Eleana Vrahali
Minos EMI singles